Acacia dolichophylla, also known as Chewings Range wattle, is a shrub of the genus Acacia and the subgenus Plurinerves that is endemic to arid parts of central Australia.

Description
Like most species of Acacia it has phyllodes rather than true leaves.

Taxonomy
The species was first formally described by the botanist Bruce Maslin in 1980 as part of the work A contribution to the flora of central Australia as published in the Journal of the Adelaide Botanic Gardens. It was reclassified in 2003 by Leslie Pedley as Racosperma dolicophyllum then transferred back to genus Acacia in 2006.
It is similar is appearance to Acacia praelongata and Acacia estrophiolata and is thought to be related to Acacia tenuior. The type specimen was collected in 1975 from around Ormiston Pound.

Distribution
It is commonly situated in sheltered and steep gullies in schistose hills in a small area of the Chewings Range in the southern part of the Northern Territory.

See also
 List of Acacia species

References

dolichophylla
Flora of the Northern Territory
Taxa named by Bruce Maslin
Plants described in 1980